Detlev Glanert (born 6 September 1960) is a German opera composer, who has also composed numerous works for chamber and full orchestra, including three symphonies.

Life 
Detlev Glanert was born in Hamburg in 1960. He came to music late, learning his first instrument, the trumpet, at the age of eleven and not starting his formal composition studies until his twenties, when he studied under Diether de la Motte, Günther Friedrichs and Frank Michael Beyer, and then for four years under Hans Werner Henze in Cologne.

Having seen his first operas in Hamburg in 1972, The Magic Flute, and then Die Soldaten, he has said that from the first moment he loved opera. It was at Henze's invitation that Glanert produced his first sizeable piece of music-theatre, the opera Leyla und Medjun which opened the first Munich Biennale, set up by Henze in 1988. Glanert then became involved in Henze's other festival, the Cantiere Internazionale d'Arte in Montepulciano, firstly as assistant co-ordinator and head of the music school from 1989 to 1993, and later returning as artistic director for the years 2009 to 2011.

In 1992/93, he was a Stipendiat of the Villa Massimo in Rome.

He reached widespread attention with his 1995 opera Der Spiegel des großen Kaisers, which was awarded the Rolf-Liebermann-Preis for opera composers.  The 1999 premiere of his next opera, Joseph Süss, was a notable cultural event according to Die Welt, which wrote: "The anticipation was truly enormous. Half of operatic Germany sat in the stalls of the Halle Opera House."

In 2002, Glanert was elected academician of the Freie Akademie der Künste Hamburg.

In 2006 Glanert's opera Caligula, to a libretto by Hans-Ulrich Treichel after the play by Albert Camus on the last days of the Roman emperor Caligula, was first staged at the Oper Frankfurt, conducted by Markus Stenz. A recording of this production was reviewed:It's a scenario that Glanert could easily have depicted in sensationalist terms, but the hallmark of his score is its refinement, both in the wonderfully imaginative sound world he creates, and in the smoothly contoured vocal lines. It's an impressive achievement, and the sense of scarcely suppressed menace that pervades the work and carries unmistakable echoes of Strauss's Elektra and Salome is powerfully conjured.

He is a Fellow of the Royal Northern College of Music.

Style

Glanert insists on the importance of connecting with the audience, of making them find something of themselves in the music: 
He typically takes a traditional topos – a standard story or situation – and interprets it with a contemporary slant.  In Caligula, for example, the modern twist is that the emperor is not mad but cruel entirely by choice. In Joseph Süss, the story of a Jew executed after being made a scapegoat at a secret trial over 250 years ago, the story reflects not only the Germany of 1738 but that of 1933 to 1945. The darker side of human nature is a recurring theme in Glanert's work. "I look at people as animals because sometimes they behave as animals, as you know", he said of one of his larger orchestral pieces, the Theatrum Bestiarum.

Glanert talked about his musical influences in an interview in 1996. After an initial period of three years when he submerged his own musical personality under that of Henze, he developed his own style between the contrasting poles of Gustav Mahler and Maurice Ravel – Mahler for his structural perspective, "the simple, the dramatic sense of the music", and Ravel for his surface textures, "the artificial masquerade of sounds".

Works

Stage works

The chamber operas Leviathan, Der Engel, der das Wasser bewegte and Der Engel auf dem Schiff can be performed together as the  trilogy Drei Wasserspiele.

Other works (selected)
 Mahler/Skizze (1989)
 Geheimer Raum ('Secret Room'). Chamber sonata no.3 (2002)
 Theatrum Bestiarum, (Subtitled 'Songs and dances for large orchestra'). (2005)
 Vier Präludien und Ernste Gesänge ('Four Preludes and Serious Songs', after Brahms's Vier ernste Gesänge) (2005)
 Fluß ohne Ufer ('Shoreless River') (2008)
 Einsamkeit ('Loneliness', an orchestration of the Schubert song D.620) (2010)
 Requiem für Hieronymus Bosch (2016)

Recordings
 Mahler/Skizze. London Sinfonietta / Oliver Knussen. WER 6522-2
 Theatrum Bestiarum. WDR Sinfonieorchester Köln / Semyon Bychkov. SACD AV 2137
 Caligula. World premiere recording. Oper Frankfurt / Markus Stenz. OehmsClassics OC 932
 Brahms, Johannes/Detlev Glanert: Four Preludes and Serious Songs, Helsinki Philharmonic Orchestra, Olari Elts (conductor), Ondine Records, ODE 1263-2
 Teddy Tahu Rhodes recorded Four Preludes and Serious Songs on his album Serious Songs in 2011 with the Tasmanian Symphony Orchestra under Sebastian Lang-Lessing for ABC Classics.

Reference sources

External links
 Biography, works list, recordings and performance, Boosey & Hawkes
 Documentary: Detlev Glanert on Detlev Glanert
 

German opera composers
Male opera composers
20th-century classical composers
21st-century classical composers
1960 births
Living people
Musicians from Hamburg
German male classical composers
20th-century German composers
21st-century German composers
20th-century German male musicians
21st-century German male musicians